Euxoa tessellata, the tessellate dart or striped cutworm is a moth of the family Noctuidae. It is the most widespread Euxoa-species in North America. It is found from Newfoundland to Alaska, south in the west to California, Arizona, New Mexico, south in the east to Florida. It seems to be absent from Texas and adjacent eastern states.

The wingspan is 30–38 mm. Adults are on wing from June to September.

The larvae feed on tobacco, various garden crops, as well as the leaves of apple, cherry and pear.

The tessellata GROUP in North America consists of two species - E. tessellata and E. plagigera. The two species are dissimilar in appearance, but are related by genital features Lepidoptera genitalia. They will hybridize in the lab, but the result is a sterile offspring.

References

External links
Images
Bug Guide
The Noctuinae (Lepidoptera: Noctuidae) of Great Smoky Mountains National Park, U.S.A.

Euxoa
Moths of North America
Moths described in 1841